Frederick Richard "Fred" White (6 February 1927 – 20 October 1973) was an Australian politician who served as a Country Party member of the Legislative Council of Western Australia from 1967 until his death.

White was born in Perth but was raised in the country, attending Northam Senior High School. He enlisted in the Royal Australian Air Force (RAAF) in February 1945, just after his 18th birthday, and served until the war ended later in the year. White worked as a tradesman for a period after the war, and then studied teaching at the University of Western Australia and Claremont Teachers College. Beginning in 1959, he worked as a science teacher at various high schools in the Perth metropolitan area. He was elected to the Kalamunda Shire Council in 1963, while still working as a teacher, and served as shire president from 1965 to 1968. White entered parliament at a 1967 Legislative Council by-election, necessitated by the death of Ray Jones, and was re-elected at the 1968 state election. However, his time in parliament was cut short by his sudden death in October 1973, at the age of 46. White had married Joyce Mary Bridges in 1953, with whom he had three children.

References

1927 births
1973 deaths
Australian schoolteachers
Members of the Western Australian Legislative Council
National Party of Australia members of the Parliament of Western Australia
Politicians from Perth, Western Australia
Royal Australian Air Force personnel of World War II
University of Western Australia alumni
Mayors of places in Western Australia
Western Australian local councillors